The University of Rhode Island, College of Pharmacy is a pharmacy school located in the URI’s Kingston campus in southern Rhode Island, United States. Founded in 1902 as the Rhode Island College of Pharmacy and Allied Sciences in Providence, Rhode Island, the College relocated to the University of Rhode Island in Kingston in 1957.

History
 In the early 1870s, the first pharmacy classes were taking place in Rhode Island which resulted in the creation of the Rhode Island College of Pharmacy and Allied Sciences in 1902 that operated in Providence, RI through 1957. The first class included 21 students with 2 being female. In 1955, the College’s trustees and pharmacy leaders throughout the state felt an affiliation with the state university would be helpful, and established the College of Pharmacy at URI in 1956, with a final approval granted by the Rhode Island General Assembly. The school was transferred to the University of Rhode Island’s (URI) Kingston Campus and opened its doors in 1957.

The initial home for the College was Pastore Hall and Ranger Hall on the Kingston campus. In 1960, the same year that the College instituted the five-year bachelor’s degree, Rhode Island voters approved a $1.5 million bond referendum for a new pharmacy and nursing building. Fogarty Hall was initially designed to accommodate 150 students and 10 faculty members. By 2000, the facility hosted 700 students and 40 faculty. Recognizing Fogarty space constraints, a bond proposal for $65 million for a new pharmacy building to be part of a new health and life sciences district in the northern portion of the Kingston Campus was approved in 2006.

In 2014, Thomas M. Ryan, a 1975 pharmacy graduate and the former chairman, president and CEO of CVS Caremark, and his wife, Cathy, made the largest private donation in URI’s history to establish the George & Anne Ryan Institute for Neuroscience. In 2015 the College, along with URI’s Colleges of Nursing and Health Sciences, became part of URI’s Academic Health Collaborative (AHC) with the goal of fostering greater collaboration amongst the health disciplines.

By 2020, the College was home to 767 Doctor of Pharmacy students and 136 Bachelors and 56 graduate students in the pharmaceutical sciences.

Reputation

As of FY2020, the College has consistently earned a #1 ranking in New England in Pharmacy Board Pass Rate (94% pass rate), according to the National Association of Boards of Pharmacy. In the rankings released for 2021, U.S. News & World Report ranked the College of Pharmacy at URI as a "Best Graduate School (Pharmacy)."

Departments 

The College of Pharmacy consists of two major departments organized around different areas of the pharmaceutical sciences.
Department of Biomedical and Pharmaceutical Sciences (BPS)
Department of Pharmacy Practice (PHP)
The Rhode Island State Crime Laboratory is also part of the College.

Research
In 2016, the College of Pharmacy’s research awards exceeded $6.5 million. In 2020, the college's total reportable research federal funding was $15M.

Notable alumni
Thomas M. Ryan- Former Chair and CEO of CVS/Health
Ernest Mario- Former CEO and Chair, Glaxo Pharmaceuticals, ALZA Corp.
Hubert Humphrey- former Vice President of the United States (honorary degree)

References 

University of Rhode Island